Balmoral Golf Club is located on Lisburn Road, in south Belfast, three miles south of the city centre. It is an 18-hole course with a par of 69. 
The course was founded in 1914.

The course is comparatively flat in nature and has a number of intentionally placed trees. It has a putting green practice area and pitching area.

Balmoral has had a long association with Fred Daly, the first Irishman to win the Open Championship, in 1947. The club has also had four Ryder Cup representatives.

References

External links
Balmoral Golf Club

Golf clubs and courses in Northern Ireland
Sports clubs in Belfast